The 2017 Bol Open was a professional tennis tournament played on outdoor clay courts in Bol, Croatia.  It was the twelfth edition of the tournament and part of the 2017 WTA 125K series. It took place on 6–11 June 2017.

Singles entrants

Seeds 

 1 Rankings as of 29 May 2017.

Other entrants 
The following players received wildcards into the singles main draw:
  Sara Errani
  Tena Lukas
  Ajla Tomljanović
  Natalia Vikhlyantseva

The following players received entry from the qualifying draw:
  Ana Biškić
  Chuang Chia-jung
  Xenia Knoll
  Prarthana Thombare

Withdrawals
Before the tournament
  Catherine Bellis →replaced by  Viktoriya Tomova
  Ana Bogdan →replaced by  Renata Voráčová
  Jana Čepelová →replaced by  Tereza Mrdeža
  Sorana Cîrstea →replaced by  Elitsa Kostova
  Ons Jabeur →replaced by  Ivana Jorović
  Irina Khromacheva →replaced by  Misa Eguchi
  Varvara Lepchenko →replaced by  Tamara Zidanšek
  Magda Linette →replaced by  Olga Sáez Larra
  Petra Martić →replaced by  Alexandra Panova
  Christina McHale →replaced by  Olga Govortsova
  Patricia Maria Țig →replaced by  Lina Gjorcheska
  Zheng Saisai →replaced by  Alexandra Cadanțu

Doubles entrants

Seeds 

 1 Rankings as of May 29, 2017 .

Other entrants 
The following pairs received a wildcard into the doubles main draw:
  Ana Biškić /  Ani Mijačika

Champions

Singles 

  Aleksandra Krunić def.  Alexandra Cadanțu, 6–3, 3–0 ret.

Doubles 

  Chuang Chia-jung /  Renata Voráčová def.  Lina Gjorcheska /  Aleksandrina Naydenova, 6–4, 6–2

References

External links 
 Official website

2017 WTA 125K series
2017 in Croatian tennis
Croatian Bol Ladies Open
June 2017 sports events in Europe